A live album is one that was recorded at a concert before an audience.

Live album may also refer to:

 Live Album (Grand Funk Railroad album), 1970
 Live Album, an album by Country Teasers, 2005
 The Live Album, an album by Robert Earl Keen, 1988
 The Live Album, an album by Leon Russell and New Grass Revival, 1981

See also
 List of albums titled Live
 Live discography, recordings by the American rock band Live